Bruce Grubbs is an American politician who served as a member of the Montana House of Representatives for the 68th district from 2017 to 2021.

Early life and education 

Grubbs grew up in Detroit and graduated from the University of Michigan in 1972. He moved to Bozeman in 1982.

Political career 

Grubbs was previously a member of the Bozeman, Montana School Board.

In 2016, Grubbs ran for election to represent District 68 in the Montana House of Representatives, challenging incumbent Art Wittich, as well as Michael Comstock, in the Republican primary. Grubbs won the three-way primary with 45.12% of the vote, and went on to win the general election with 74.37% of the vote. He was reelected in 2018, defeating Ron Murray in the Republican primary and Seth Mangini in the general election.

In 2020, Grubbs ran for reelection again, but lost the Republican primary to Caleb Hinkle.

Elections

References 

Year of birth missing (living people)
Living people
Republican Party members of the Montana House of Representatives
21st-century American politicians
University of Michigan alumni